This page details football records in Poland.

Team records

Most top-division championships won

Overall
15, Legia Warsaw.

Consecutive
5, Górnik Zabrze (1962/63 season to 1967/68 season).

Most Polish Cups won

Overall
19, Legia Warsaw.

Consecutive
5, Górnik Zabrze (1967/68 season to 1971/72 season).

Most League Cups won

Overall
2, Dyskobolia Grodzisk Wielkopolski.

Consecutive
2, Dyskobolia Grodzisk Wielkopolski (2006/07 season to 2007/08 season).

Most SuperCups won

Overall
6, Lech Poznań.

Consecutive
2, Amica Wronki (1998 edition to 1999 edition)

Most successful clubs overall

See also
 Football in Poland
 Poland national football team
 Polish Championship in Football
 Polish Cup

Records
Poland